Covino is a surname of Italian origin. The name refers to:
Ammon Covino (see SeaQuest Interactive Aquariums), American aquarium operator and convicted poacher
Christina Covino, American television soap opera writer.
Steve Covino, a former American soccer player

External links
 Name History and Origin for  covino

Italian-language surnames